Mukah Sarawak Polytechnic (abbreviated as PMU) is a TVET institute located in Mukah, Sarawak which is the first in central region of Sarawak. Being the twentieth polytechnic in Malaysia, PMU is the third polytechnic in Borneo island after Kuching Sarawak Polytechnic and Kota Kinabalu Polytechnic. The campus is built on a 100-acre site and is equipped with modern infrastructure and state of the art educational facilities.

The institute first operation began at Sibu Technical Secondary School in 2004. The first intake of students was in July 2005 session with pilot courses such as Certificate in Information Technology, Certificate in Civil Engineering and Certificate in Business Studies. Course offerings increased a year later where Diploma level courses were also offered by all five major academic departments. When PMU first started it had only 156 students, but in 2010 the population has increased to 3,144.

Background 
List of Directors

Programme Offered

 Department of Civil Engineering
 Diploma in Civil Engineering 
 Department of Electrical Engineering
 Diploma in Electrical and Electronic Engineering
 Diploma in Electrical Engineering (Communication)
 Department of Mechanical Engineering
 Diploma in Mechanical Engineering
 Department of Commerce
 Diploma in Accountancy
 Diploma in Business Studies
 Diploma in Secretarial Science
 Department of Information, Communication and Technology
 Diploma in Information Technology (Digital Technology) Software and Application Development
 Diploma in Information Technology (Digital Technology) Network System
 Department of General Studies
 Islamic and Moral Education Unit
 English Language Unit
 Department of Mathematics, Science and Computer
 Pre-Diploma (Science)

Academic

The offering of general subjects, science and mathematics is offered by the Department of General Studies (JPA) and the Department of Mathematics, Science and Computer (JMSK).

In addition to the full-time courses, PMU also offers short-term courses that are open to the public and the local community under the Time Sector Privatization (TSP) program. The program promotes lifelong learning among the local community. Through such programs, it is hoped that the establishment of PMU in Mukah could help the local community to improve their knowledge, skills, competencies or gain new knowledge and skills.

Campus Residential College

References

External links 

 Official Portal of Politeknik Mukah

Polytechnics in Malaysia
Universities and colleges in Sarawak
Engineering universities and colleges in Malaysia
Business schools in Malaysia
Information technology schools in Malaysia
2004 establishments in Malaysia
Educational institutions established in 2004
Technical universities and colleges in Malaysia